The Perfect Lover is a lost 1919 American silent drama film directed by Ralph Ince and starring Eugene O'Brien. It was produced and distributed by Selznick Pictures Corporation.

Cast
Eugene O'Brien as Brian Lazar
Lucille Lee Stewart as Mrs. Byfield
Marguerite Courtot as Eileen Hawthorn
Mary Boland as Mrs. Whitney
Martha Mansfield as Mavis Morgan
Tom McRayne as Prof. Hawthorn
Ann Brody (uncredited)
Merceita Esmond (uncredited)

References

External links

Lobby card with Eugene O'Brien and Marguerite Courtot(Wayback Machine)

1919 films
American silent feature films
Lost American films
Films based on short fiction
Films directed by Ralph Ince
1919 drama films
American black-and-white films
Selznick Pictures films
Silent American drama films
1919 lost films
Lost drama films
1910s American films